Paddy Byrne was an Irish Free State international footballer.

Believe it or not, a defender, Byrne was capped three times for the Irish Free State at senior level. He made his debut in a 1–1 draw with Spain on 26 April 1931 in Barcelona and played twice against the Netherlands national football team, in 1932 and 1934.

At club level, Byrne played for Dolphin, Shelbourne and Dumcondra, all based in Dublin.

References

External links
 Profile from soccerscene.ie

Republic of Ireland association footballers
Republic of Ireland international footballers
Drumcondra F.C. players
Association football defenders
Year of birth missing